Elizabeth A. 'Liz' Franz is a New Zealand academic neuroscientist, as of 2019 is a full professor at the University of Otago.

Academic career

After a 1988 MSc titled  'An examination of the spatial and temporal limitations in bimanual coordination.'  at the Purdue University, further PhD, and post-docs at UC Berkeley, Franz moved to the University of Otago, rising to full professor.

Since 2004 Franz has directed the cognitive neuroscience program at Otago.

Selected works 
 Franz, Elizabeth A., Howard N. Zelaznik, and George McCabe. "Spatial topological constraints in a bimanual task." Acta Psychologica 77, no. 2 (1991): 137–151.
 Franz, Elizabeth A., James C. Eliassen, Richard B. Ivry, and Michael S. Gazzaniga. "Dissociation of spatial and temporal coupling in the bimanual movements of callosotomy patients." Psychological Science 7, no. 5 (1996): 306–310.
 Franz, Elizabeth A., Howard N. Zelaznik, Stephan Swinnen, and Charles Walter. "Spatial conceptual influences on the coordination of bimanual actions: When a dual task becomes a single task." Journal of Motor Behavior 33, no. 1 (2001): 103–112.
 Franz, Elizabeth A., and V. S. Ramachandran. "Bimanual coupling in amputees with phantom limbs." Nature Neuroscience 1, no. 6 (1998): 443.

References

Living people
New Zealand neuroscientists
New Zealand women academics
Year of birth missing (living people)
Purdue University alumni
Academic staff of the University of Otago
New Zealand women writers